The "What Time Is Love?" Story is a compilation album by British electronic music duo The KLF, comprising six versions of their techno track "What Time Is Love?".

Origin
By 1989 (see 1989 in music), the popularity of the "Pure Trance Original" of "What Time Is Love?" in European clubs had reportedly spawned eighteen unauthorised cover versions and sound-alikes. In a novel move, some of these were collated by The Orb's Alex Paterson at The KLF's behest, and released as a compilation album entitled The "What Time Is Love?" Story, which was sold commercially for half the price of a conventional album.

Released on 25 September 1989 on LP and CD, The "What Time Is Love?" Story used the same basic design lay-out as the "Pure Trance Original" singles, but the colour scheme was altered: lurid pink writing on lurid green (for the vinyl), and lurid green on lurid pink (for the CD).

Authorship
Many commentators have speculated that all of these 'covers' were in fact the work of The KLF themselves. Q magazine, for example, commented that "one wonders why all the vocalists sound so alike (and British, even when praising Allah)" and asked of their readers "wouldn't it be a good scam if you released 18 differing versions scattered across Europe?".  However, of the artists featuring on the LP, all possess an independent discography: Liaisons D, a collective that includes techno producer Frank De Wulf, has an extensive discography; Neon is Belgian producer Jean Pierre Bulté of Target Records; Dr. Felix is a pseudonym of Italian producer Claudio Donato. And finally, K.L.F.S., albeit being a one-off shoot, was actually the brainchild of two Italian Hi-NRG producers M. Parmigiani and Marcello Catalano.

The album also includes a live version of "What Time Is Love?", performed at the "Land Of Oz", the chill-out room of the London nightclub Heaven, where Paterson regularly DJed alongside The KLF co-founder Jimmy Cauty.  The track was recorded on 31 July 1989, one week after a single release of further "What Time Is Love?" remixes.  The date also marked the release of The KLF's pop single "Kylie Said to Jason".

Track listing
 The KLF — "What Time Is Love?" (Original) – 7:05
 Dr. Felix — "Relax Your Body" – 6:32
 K.L.F.S. — "What Time Is Love?" (Italian Mix) – 6:10
 Liaisons D. — "Heartbeat" – 5:55
 Neon — "No Limit" (Dance Mix 4'58) – 4:58
 The KLF — "What Time Is Love?" (Live at the Land of Oz) – 8:43

Notes

References
Discogs.com, KLF Communications discography

Author unknown (1991). "The KLF: Enigmatic dance duo" (feature and discography up to that time), Record Collector Magazine, April 1991.

The KLF albums
House music albums by British artists
Rave albums
1989 compilation albums
KLF Communications compilation albums